This is a list of countries by GDP (real) per capita growth rate, i.e., the growth rate of GDP per capita or the rate of increase of income per person. These numbers are corrected for inflation but not for purchasing power parity.

This list is not to be confused with the list of countries by real GDP growth, which is the growth rate of the value of all final goods and services produced within a country.

10 years change
GDP per capita (constant) growth according to the World Bank.

Five-year average

Sources

See also

External links 
  Economics focus: Grossly distorted picture From Mar 13th 2008, The Economist print edition. Sub-title "If you look at GDP per head, the world is a different—and, by and large, a better—place"
 GDP: GDP per capita, annual growth rate from EarthTrends of World Resources Institute
 GDP per capita growth (annual %) — The World Bank

Lists of countries by per capita values
Lists of countries by GDP per capita